Glyphodes duplicalis is a moth in the family Crambidae. It was described by Hiroshi Inoue, Eugene G. Munroe and Akira Mutuura in 1981. It is found in Japan, Korea and Taiwan.

References

Moths described in 1981
Glyphodes